Seán Burke is a literary theorist and novelist. His work as a theorist challenges the postmodern displacement of the self and reintroduces the author as a central concept in contemporary thought. Burke’s fiction explores themes of alienation and addiction in claustrophobic settings such as the old Tiger Bay of his native Cardiff.

Early life and career 
Burke was born to an Irish family in Cardiff, Wales in 1961. He studied English and Philosophy at the University of Kent and received a Ph.D. from the University of Edinburgh in 1989. He was Reader in English Studies at the University of Durham where he taught from 1992-2006 and has since worked as a freelance writer

Academic Writing 
At a time when continental theorists and philosophers were heralding the death of the author as a twentieth-century event analogous to the death of God, Burke argued that anti-authorial discourses were contradictory and self-defeating. His first book, The Death and Return of the Author demonstrated through close readings and philosophical analysis that the concept of the author nonetheless remained profoundly active in theoretical discourses which promulgated the death of the author. Burke’s project of ‘the return of the author’ was developed in Authorship: From Plato to the Postmodern and The Ethics of Writing, the latter book arguing that authors can be held responsible not only for intended but also unintended consequences of their work.

Fiction 
Burke’s first novel, Deadwater, a Cardiff-set work of literary noir, was widely praised upon publication for its evocation of a docklands’ community in terminal decline. The novel has appeared in French translation and was optioned as a film by Rising Tide Productions. His second novel, The Englishwoman, concerning a young woman who voluntarily enters into a jihadist hostage situation, came out in May 2021.

Influence 
The Death and Return of the Author was positively reviewed within a week of publication in 1992 by James Wood who wrote: ‘This very distinguished book is that mixture of rigour and plainness in theory that readers who care about the author have been awaiting.’  Now regarded as a classic, The Death and Return of the Author has gone through expanded second and third editions in 1998 and 2009 and is credited with reopening the field of author studies for an age of theory. As Brian Vickers said: ‘The whole concept of the death of the author has been finally put to rest by Seán Burke.’

Academic Books 
 The Death and Return of the Author: Criticism and Subjectivity in Barthes, Foucault and Derrida (Edinburgh: Edinburgh University Press, 1992) 
 Authorship from Plato to the Postmodern: A Reader (Edinburgh: Edinburgh University Press, 1995) 
 The Death and Return of the Author, Second Edition (Edinburgh: Edinburgh University Press, 1998) 
 The Death and Return of the Author, Third Edition (Edinburgh: Edinburgh University Press, 2008) 
 The Ethics of Writing: Authorship and Legacy in Plato and Nietzsche (Edinburgh: Edinburgh University Press, 2008)

Novels 
 Deadwater (London: Serpent's Tail, 2002) 
 Au Bout des Docks, trans. Ellies Claude-Robert (Paris: Rivages, 2008). French translation of Deadwater. 
 The Englishwoman, OMG Publishing, 2021

Short Stories 
 ‘The Regenerate Man’, Shorts from South Glamorgan, Tracey Walton ed., (Peterborough: Forward Press, 199 
 ‘The Trials of Mahmood Mattan’ in John Williams ed., Wales, Half Welsh (London: Bloomsbury, 2004) 
 ‘The Night of Nights, 1948’, Riptide, v.2 (2008)

Notes

Literary theorists
Academics of Durham University

 Welsh writers
Writers from Cardiff